Alex Murphy or Alexander Murphy may refer to:

 Alex Murphy (actor), Irish actor
 Alex Murphy (footballer), Irish U19 footballer playing for Newcastle United U23
 Alex Murphy (basketball) (born 1993), American college basketball player
 Alex Murphy (figure skater)
 Alex Murphy (rugby league) (born 1939), English rugby league footballer and coach
 Alex Murphy (Shortland Street), a fictional character on the New Zealand soap opera
 Alex James Murphy, the human name of RoboCop
 Alex Murphy, one of the perpetrators of the Corporals killings
 Alexander Murphy farm, the location of John Brown's Fort